Without Regret may refer to:

Without Regret (film), a 1935 American film
Without Regret (album), a 2011 album by Kimberly Caldwell
(Without Regret.), a 2014 EP by British band Smash